Perak state route A147 or Jalan Padang Tembak is a state road in Teluk Intan, Perak, Malaysia. It is also act as a bypass of Teluk Intan town centre.

List of key points along Jalan Padang Tembak, Teluk Intan

Padang Tembak, Teluk Intan